Ronald Lee Shoop (September 19, 1931 – March 14, 2003) was an American professional baseball player and catcher, who played part of the  season for the Detroit Tigers. His professional career extended for ten years (1951–52 and 1955–62). He missed the 1953–54 seasons while performing military service.

For his MLB career, Shoop compiled a .143 batting average in seven at-bats, with one run batted in. His lone hit, a single, came off Bob Shaw of the Chicago White Sox in Shoop's final big-league game.

He was born and later died in Rural Valley, Pennsylvania, at the age of 71.

External links

1931 births
2003 deaths
Albuquerque Dukes players
Augusta Tigers players
Baseball players from Pennsylvania
Birmingham Barons players
Dallas Rangers players
Davenport Tigers players
Detroit Tigers players
Durham Bulls players
Fort Worth Cats players
Jamestown Falcons players
Knoxville Smokies players
Lancaster Red Roses players
Major League Baseball catchers
People from Armstrong County, Pennsylvania
Richmond Tigers players
Terre Haute Tigers players
Williamsport Tigers players
American expatriate baseball players in Nicaragua